Eliza was a sloop-rigged longboat that was involved in the rescue of the survivors of the wreck of  in 1797.

Eliza sailed from Sydney on 30 May 1797 to Preservation Island in Bass Strait. On arrival Eliza took on board several survivors and some cargo. Under the command of Archibald Armstrong (who was sailing master aboard , Eliza sailed for Sydney but was never seen again. 

In 1803  found a large boat between Port Phillip and Westernport and it was thought that it was Eliza.

Citations and references
Citations

References
 

Shipwrecks of Victoria (Australia)
Maritime incidents in 1797
Missing ships
Ships lost with all hands